Wrestlingworth is a village and former civil parish, now in the parish of Wrestlingworth and Cockayne Hatley, in the Central Bedfordshire district of the ceremonial county of Bedfordshire, England about  east of the county town of Bedford. Wrestlingworth incorporates the hamlet of Water End, some half mile to the south of the village centre. At the 2011 census date it had a population of 591.

Amenities in the village include a pre-school group and a Church of England VC Lower School. Wrestlingworth has a number of listed buildings including the Church of St Peter, and the centre of the village is a Conservation Area.

Community groups in the village often meet at the Grade I listed 17th-century pub, The Chequers.   These include the local Women's Institute, the Goodwill Fund, the Walking and Wildlife Group, The Bowls Club and the Pre-School support group.

Geography
The eastern parish boundary borders Cambridgeshire.

Elevation

Landscape

Natural England has designated the area as part of The Bedfordshire and Cambridgeshire Claylands (NCA 88).
Central Bedfordshire Council has classified the landscape as Dunton Clay Vale. Not technically a 'vale', it is used here to mean a transitional landscape between a valley and a plateau. Medium to large fields of cereal crops dominate. The limited woodland cover and incomplete or unhedged roads reveal an open, undulating landscape. Former hedgerow lines are marked in places by trees.

Geology, soil type and land use

The majority of the parish is arable farmland but there are also a number of paddocks for horses, cattle and sheep grazing. Most of the parish lies on boulder clay but there is a small strip of gault running through Wrestlingworth village centre. The whole parish has highly fertile lime-rich loamy and clayey soils with slightly impeded drainage.

Lousy Bush, a small  nature reserve is at a former gravel pit to the south-west of the village. It is registered as common land and owned by the Parish Council.

The night sky and light pollution

Light pollution is the level of radiance (night lights) shining up into the night sky. The Campaign to Protect Rural England (CPRE) divides the level of night sky brightness into 9 bands with band 1 being the darkest i.e. with the lowest level of light pollution and band 9 the brightest and most polluted. Wrestlingworth is in bands 3 and 4 with darker sky surrounding, particularly looking north-east.

Public footpaths and bridleways

A public footpath from Water End links with bridleways to Biggleswade via Lousy Bush, The Lodge, Dunton Fen, Sunderland Hall Farm and West Sunderland Farm.

History
Wrestlingworth is not mentioned in the Domesday Book.  However, by the mid-12th century two manor houses – Kendale's and Hereford's - are recorded as the village which was being established along the banks of a tributary of the River Cam. Historic names were Wrastlingewurde in the 12th century and Wrestlingforth in the 17th and 18th centuries.

The Church of St. Peter was established in about 1300. Graves from the Great Plague are still clearly visible in St. Peter's churchyard, together with low set ‘leper’ windows.

There used to be a post office/shop and a local convenience store but now there is just a hairdressers and a public house, The Chequers.

In 1961 the parish had a population of 393.

The last woman to be publicly hanged in England
In the 1840s, notoriety hit the village when the case of the murderer Sarah Dazley came to the fore. By the age of 25, Dazley had poisoned two husbands and a child. She was about to marry a third husband when villagers warned him of her past and subsequent investigations took place. These commenced with exhumation of the bodies and a Coroner's Inquest which was held in The Chequers Pub. Traces of arsenic were found and several local residents gave evidence against Dazley during her trial at Bedford Assizes.

At the end of the case, Dazley was found guilty and sentenced to be hanged outside Bedford Gaol. She was the last woman to be publicly hanged in England and it is said that the entire Wrestlingworth community walked or rode over to Bedford to see the event.

Governance
Wrestlingworth & Cockayne Hatley Parish Council has seven elected members and meets bi-monthly at the Memorial Hall.
Wrestlingworth is part of Potton ward for elections to the Central Bedfordshire Unitary Authority. On 1 April 1985 the parish was abolished and merged with Cockayne Hatley to form "Wrestlingworth & Cockayne Hatley".

Prior to 1894, Wrestlingworth was administered as part of the Hundred of Biggleswade.
From 1894 until 1974 the village was in Biggleswade Rural District and from 1974 to 2009 in Mid Bedfordshire District.

Wrestlingworth was in the Mid Bedfordshire parliamentary constituency until 1997. Now in North East Bedfordshire, the elected member is Richard Fuller of the Conservative Party.

Public services
Wrestlingworth is in the Potton Public Water Supply Zone (RW50). The water supplied by Anglian Water comes from groundwater boreholes and is chloraminated and classed as hard.

The Eastern Power Area of UK Power Networks is the distribution network operator for electricity. There is no mains gas supply.

The nearest general hospitals are Bedford (Bedford Hospital NHS Trust), Lister Hospital, Stevenage (East and North Hertfordshire NHS Trust) and Addenbrooke's Hospital, Cambridge (Cambridge University Hospitals NHS Foundation Trust). Ambulance services are provided by the East of England Ambulance Service NHS Trust. Bedfordshire Fire and Rescue Service and Bedfordshire Police cover the village.

The closest public library is at Potton.

Public transport
Centrebus (South) runs bus route no. 188 south to Biggleswade and Hitchin (journey time 50 minutes) and to Potton and Sandy. The service is normally two hourly, daytime only, Monday to Saturday. Ivel Sprinter runs bus route no. 3 to Cambridge each Wednesday.

The nearest railway stations are Biggleswade and Sandy.

Notable people
Sydney Beaumont, a former professional football player and manager, runner and cricketer was born in Wrestlingworth.

References

External links

Villages in Bedfordshire
Former civil parishes in Bedfordshire
Central Bedfordshire District